Sierra Blanca is an unincorporated area in Hudspeth County, Texas, United States. It is also the county seat of the county and the namesake of a census-designated place (CDP) in which it is located. The town is part of the Trans-Pecos region of far West Texas, is located northeast of the Mexican border and is within the Mountain Time Zone. As of the 2010 census, its population was 553.

The town was founded in 1881 at the completion point of a long-sought southern transcontinental railway. Sierra Blanca has served as the junction of the Southern Pacific and Missouri Pacific railroads. Hudspeth County was formed in 1917 from El Paso County. Sierra Blanca was named the county seat, and has the only adobe courthouse in Texas.

The town continues to accommodate travelers between Van Horn and El Paso along Interstate 10, which is the main route that connects Texas from west to southeast. The town was named for the nearby Sierra Blanca Mountain, which was in turn named for the white poppies that grew there (sierra blanca is Spanish for "white mountain").

The letters "SB" can be seen on a nearby mountain from Interstate 10.

Geography

The town is part of the Trans-Pecos region within the most mountainous and arid portion of Texas. The town is located in Hudspeth County, which is large and sparsely populated.

Soil in the surrounding area is mostly nonarable due to lack of water, so cannot sustain large-scale farming. Due to the high altitude of the town, it has a cooler climate than other areas of the Chihuahuan Desert.

Climate
Summers are hot with mild nights. The town occasionally experiences high winds and dust storms. July is normally the warmest month, with the highest recorded temperature in town being  in 1994. During the winter, the jet stream periodically dips far south and brings extremely low temperatures.

During the hurricane season, tropical storms can sometimes bring large amounts of precipitation to the arid mountainous region and can cause flash flooding.

Demographics

2020 census

As of the 2020 United States census, there were 315 people, 267 households, and 159 families residing in the CDP.

2010 census
As of the 2010 census,  553 people, 172 households, and 126 families were residing in the CDP. The population density was 116.0 people/sq mi (50.6/km2). The 227 housing units averaged 55.8/sq mi (21.5/km2). The racial makeup of the CDP was 83.91% White, 3.44% Native American, 3.25% Black, 1.45% Asian, 7.96% from other races, and 3.56% from two or more races. Latinos of any race were 72.61% of the population.

Of the  172 households,  40.2% had children under 18 living with them, 45.72% were married couples living together, 13.0% had a female householder with no husband present, and 31.0% were not families. About 28.3% of all households were made up of individuals, and 11.4% had someone living alone who was 65 or older. The average household size was 2.63, and the average family size was 3.31.

In the CDP, theage distribution was  29.8% under 18, 11.8% from 18 to 24, 30.8% from 25 to 44, 18.4% from 45 to 64, and 9.2% who were 65  or older. The median age was 34.3 years. For every 100 females, there were 96.0 males. For every 100 females age 18 and over, there were 101.1 males. The median income for a household in the CDP was $32,464. The per capita income for the CDP was $14,682. About 19.6% of families and 22.5% of the population were below the poverty line, including 28.3% of those under age 18 and 32.6% of those age 65 or over.

Education
Sierra Blanca is served by the Sierra Blanca Independent School District; it spends an annual average of $6,343 per student. On average, the schools have 10.9 students per teacher. For the demographic group older than 25 years, 68.6% have a high school degree, 3.2% have a bachelor's degree, and 2.6% have a graduate degree.

Hudspeth County is in the official service area of El Paso Community College.

Economy
The cost of living in Sierra Blanca is about 20% less than the US average. The CDP has a home ownership rate of 49.5%. The median home is valued at $54,600 with a 1.94% annual appreciation. 

Starting in 1992, a few miles from Sierra Blanca was the location of a sludge dump that received 250 tons of treated sewage each day by train from New York City. The practice was discontinued in 2001, after local complaints about odor and negative impact on health.

In the late 1990s, the Texas Low-Level Radioactive Waste Disposal Authority proposed a nuclear waste site near Sierra Blanca. The waste site was thought to bring an economic boost to the town. This proposal was eventually declined, citing concerns about the site being in the most seismically active region of Texas.

Press reports indicated that in 2013, the town supported three restaurants and a motel. No grocery store is in the community.

Law enforcement

In September 2012, singer Fiona Apple was arrested at a checkpoint for possession of small amounts of marijuana and hashish, and spent the night in jail there. A few weeks later, a Nelly tour bus was stopped at the same checkpoint, and 10 lb of marijuana were found on the bus along with heroin and a loaded gun. The singer was not arrested, but a member of his entourage was. Previously, rapper Snoop Dogg, musician Willie Nelson, and actor Armie Hammer had all been arrested separately for drug possession in Sierra Blanca. The United States Border Patrol checkpoint at Sierra Blanca sends the county thousands of drug cases a year and inspects 15,000 to 20,000 vehicles every day. The county is unable to prosecute the vast majority of these cases, as the federal government no longer funds such activities.

Accidents 
On July 13, 1944, three Army Air Forces crews from Biggs Army Airfield, 86 miles west of Sierra Blanca, took off on a practice mission. They proceeded to drop 10 practice bombs on Sierra Blanca. Five of the bombs disabled the main line shared by the Southern Pacific and Texas & Pacific Railroads. Another dropped on a gas station driveway, but missed the fuel tanks. No injuries or deaths were reported.

References

Census-designated places in Hudspeth County, Texas
Census-designated places in Texas
County seats in Texas